It Had to Be You is an American sitcom starring Faye Dunaway and Robert Urich. It premiered on CBS on September 19, 1993, and last aired on October 15, 1993, before being pulled from the air and put on hiatus. The series centered on Dunaway's character, Laura, a Network-like businesswoman, who hires blue-collar Mitch, a single father of three boys played by Urich, to do some carpentry work at her Boston office, and their ensuing romance.

Cast
Faye Dunaway as Laura Scofield
Robert Urich as Mitch Quinn
Robin Bartlett as Eve Parkin
Justin Whalin as David Quinn
Will Estes as Christopher Quinn
Justin Jon Ross as Sebastian Quinn

Production
The series was produced by Warner Bros. Television. The theme song was the 1924 hit "It Had to Be You" written by Isham Jones, with music by Stephen James Taylor. Four episodes were aired before the show was put on hiatus. 

Faye Dunaway was subsequently pulled from the series, and a new pilot was ordered with the focus being on Robert Urich's character coping with life as a single father. Robin Bartlett, who had played an assistant to Dunaway's character, would also continue in the series, being moved up from supporting character to co-lead.  However, her character would not be a romantic partner for Urich. Although a new pilot was shot, the revised version of the series never aired.

The show premiered eleven days after the cancellation of The Trouble with Larry, another series co-created by Andrew Nicholls and Darrell Vickers (and which lasted only three episodes).  When It Had To Be You was cancelled after four episodes, it gave Nicholls and Vickers the unusual distinction of overseeing two of the earliest-to-be-cancelled new shows of the same American television season.

Episodes

Reception
Ken Tucker of Entertainment Weekly rated the series a C+ and called it "one of the season's vaguest, most ambivalent new sitcoms". Tucker described the casting of "odd-couple lovers" Urich and Dunaway as "almost perversely capricious". Tony Scott, reviewing the pilot in Variety, criticized the "thin script" and "lumpy badinage".  Noting that the show would premiere with a special "preview glimpse" in the slot after 60 Minutes, Scott concluded that "a glimpse should be enough". David Hiltbrand of People magazine gave It Had to Be You a grade of C−.  He praised supporting actor Bartlett's performance, but felt Dunaway "seems quite uncomfortable doing comedy", and found the way her character was written to be "repulsive".  Overall, Hiltbrand characterized the show as "brittle, artificial, tiresome and devoid of romantic chemistry."

CBS put It Had to Be You on "permanent hiatus" after four episodes had aired.

References

External links

1990s American sitcoms
1993 American television series debuts
1993 American television series endings
CBS original programming
English-language television shows
Television series about families
Television series by Warner Bros. Television Studios
Television shows set in Boston